Roger Owen may refer to:
Roger Owen (historian) (1935–2018), British historian
Roger Owen (rugby) (1953–2021), Welsh rugby union, and rugby league footballer of the 1970s and 1980s
Roger Owen (MP) (1573–1617), English Member of Parliament
Roger Carmichael Robert Owen (1866–1941), British military officer
Roger Owen (lawyer), Irish lawyer and Crown official